Miss New Zealand may refer to:
Miss Earth New Zealand, a beauty pageant that selects New Zealand's representative to Miss Earth
Miss New Zealand International, a title for  New Zealand's representative to the Miss International pageant
Miss Universe New Zealand, a beauty pageant that selects New Zealand's representatives to Miss Universe
New Zealand at Miss World, a title for New Zealand's representative to the Miss World pageant